A potter is someone who makes pottery.

Potter may also refer to:

Places

United States
Potter, originally a section on the Alaska Railroad, currently a neighborhood of Anchorage, Alaska, US
Potter, Arkansas
Potter, Nebraska
Potters, New Jersey
Potter, New York
Potter, Wisconsin
Potter County, Pennsylvania
Potter County, South Dakota
Potter County, Texas
Potter Lake, Wisconsin
Potter Township (disambiguation)
Potter Valley, California
Potter Valley AVA, California wine region in Mendocino County
Potter Cemetery, Michigan

Elsewhere
7320 Potter, an asteroid
Potter Island, Nunavut, Canada
Potter Peninsula, South Shetland Islands

People and fictional characters
Potter (name), a given name and a surname, including a list of people and fictional characters with the name

Arts, entertainment, and media
Potter (TV series), a TV sitcom starring Arthur Lowe
Harry and the Potters, an American rock band
Harry Potter, worldwide bestselling book and film series
Miss Potter
The Potters (artists group), a women's artistic and literary group in St. Louis, Missouri
The Potters (film), a lost 1927 silent film

Sports
Stoke City F.C or The Potters, an English football club 
Stoke Potters, an English speedway team
The Potters, the sports teams of East Liverpool High School, Ohio

Vessels
T. J. Potter, a steamboat
USS Stephen Potter (DD-538), a naval destroyer

Other uses
"Potter", the codename of Motorola's Moto G5 Plus smartphone
Potter Box, a model for making ethical decisions
Potter sequence, a birth defect
Potter's field, a place for the burial of unknown people